Frow or FROW may refer to:
Froe, tool for cleaving wood by splitting it along the grain
John Frow, Australian professor of English
Toby Frow, director of 2007 BBC radio play 20 Cigarettes
Foundation for Recognition of Ontario Wildlife, Canadian non-governmental organisation